Alhaji Issifu Ali (born 21 May 1929 – 9 April 2019) was a Ghanaian politician and former co-chairman of the National Democratic Congress. He served as Commissioner for Works and Housing from 1966 to April 1969 and Commissioner for Information in 1969.

Early life and education 
Ali is an indigene of Wa in the Upper West region of Ghana. He was born 21 May 1929 at Enchi in the Western region of Ghana. He had his early education from 1937 to 1941 at Wa. He studied at the Tamale Teacher training college for four years. And furthered his education at St. Andrews University in Scotland where he graduated with a master's degree in Political Economy and Modern History from 1955 to 1958. He took a further course in Accounting and was conferred with Associate Chartered Accountant  (A.C.A) England and Wales and Associate of the Chartered Institute of Secretaries (A.C.I.S.).

Career 
Ali returned from the United Kingdom to Ghana and worked at Casselton and Elliot group of Company which was a group of Chartered Accountants in Accra. Later, he resigned after two years, to take on the post of Chief Accountant at the Agricultural Credit and Co-operative Bank now Agricultural Development Bank, from September 1965 until his appointment as commissioner. Ali was a board member of the Trustees for the Center for Civic Education now National Commission for Civic Education and the Executive council for the Society for the Blind Ghana.

Politics 
In 1966, Ali was appointed commissioner for Works and Housing. He was also appointed commissioner for information now Ministry of Information in 1968. On 1 August 1969, he quit his position as Commissioner of Information to engage in Politics. He stated, he together with his colleagues of the National Liberation Council decided not be executive members of the council whilst they still held on to their posts as commissioners of state. Ali was one of the first co-chairmen of the National Democratic Congress.

Personal life 
Ali's interests includes; reading, debating and swimming. He enjoyed playing tennis as well, he was married with four children. Ali was an Ahmadi.

Death 
Ali was a member of the council of elders of the National Democratic Congress before his death. He died on 9 April 2019 at the Greater Accra Regional Hospital after a short illness. He was buried at Kasoa Ahmadiya Muslim cemetery.

Former President of Ghana, Jerry John Rawlings the founder of the National Democratic Congress, paid tribute to Ali who is a former Chairman of the Party. Jerry John Rawlings said "People like him (Issifu Ali) will have a red-carpet treatment to heaven. Ali was a man of integrity. Let’s not allow people of integrity and moral authority to fade out."

See also 

 National Liberation Council.

References

Ghanaian Ahmadis
National Democratic Congress (Ghana) politicians
1929 births
2019 deaths
Information ministers of Ghana